The women's 4 × 400 metres relay at the 2019 World Athletics Championships was held at the Khalifa International Stadium in Doha, Qatar, from 5 to 6 October 2019. In the final the Jamaican team were initially disqualified, but were reinstated as the bronze medallists upon appeal.

Summary
Most events during the year do not see this level of talent.  These are the all star teams of each of these countries.  Even the IAAF World Relays don't always assemble the very best.  So in heat 1, Jamaica ran the world leading time.  In heat 2, USA bettered it setting up a good final.

Like the mixed relay, USA was able to assemble a new team of four fresh athletes.  Phyllis Francis led off taking an early lead, making up the 3-turn stagger distance and passing both teams, Canada and Ukraine to her outside early into the final turn.  Poland's lone fresh athlete Iga Baumgart-Witan and Jamaica's Anastasia Le-Roy held relatively close to the stagger, passing just three step and five steps behind.  GBR's Zoey Clark and Belgium's Hanne Claes kept them in the mix after one leg.  Second leg for USA was their young hurdling star Sydney McLaughlin.  She was so far ahead at the break, there was no need for strategic maneuvering, and she ran a perfect tangent from lane 7 to the beginning of the far turn taking a 5 metre lead on Patrycja Wyciszkiewicz with Britain's Jodie Williams close behind.  McLaughlin built up a 9 metre lead by her handoff to the hurdle world record holder Dalilah Muhammad, who true to form from her hurdle race, took off hard, expanding the gap to 15 metres through the first turn.  It was almost 20 metres over Poland's Małgorzata Hołub-Kowalik by the handoff, which behind her, Jamaica's Stephenie Ann McPherson was able to pull back lost ground against Britain's fresh Emily Diamond.  On anchor USA put 400 meter 4th place Wadeline Jonathas, Jamaica had their rested bronze medalist Shericka Jackson while Poland also had their best finalist, 7th place Justyna Święty-Ersetic, but with that lead, the battle was for silver.  Tightening the gap through the turn, Jackson ran by GBR's Laviai Nielsen and Święty-Ersetic on the backstretch.  With Jonathas long gone over 20 metres ahead, Święty-Ersetic stayed on Jackson's shoulder through the final turn then pulled into lane 2 for running room.  She couldn't sprint by Jackson, but Święty-Ersetic slowly narrowed the gap.  Just before Jonathas crossed the finish line, Święty-Ersetic edged back ahead.  Unable to respond, Jackson gave up the fight and eased across the finish line with bronze 3 metres behind.

Aided by legs of 49.51 by Francis, 49.78 by McLaughlin, 49.43 by Muhammad and 50.20 by Jonathas, USA ran the #18 time in history.  Allyson Felix ran a 49.8 leg in the preliminary round and received a gold medal.  It added to her record totals, now of 13 gold and 18 total medals at the World Championships.

Records
Before the competition records were as follows:

The following records were matched or set at the competition:

Schedule
The event schedule, in local time (UTC+3), was as follows:

Results

Heats
The first three in each heat (Q) and the next two fastest (q) qualified for the final.

Final
The final was started on 6 October at 21:19.

References

4 x 400 metres relay
Relays at the World Athletics Championships